The 2024 United States presidential election in New Hampshire is scheduled to take place on Tuesday, November 5, 2024, as part of the 2024 United States elections in which all 50 states plus the District of Columbia will participate. New Hampshire voters will choose electors to represent them in the Electoral College via a popular vote. The state of New Hampshire has four electoral votes in the Electoral College, following reapportionment due to the 2020 United States census in which the state neither gained nor lost a seat.

Incumbent Democratic president Joe Biden has stated that he intends to run for reelection to a second term.

Primary elections

New Hampshire has held the famous "first-in-the-nation" primary since 1920. Delegates are elected separately from a non-binding poll, which dates from 1952. Candidates qualify by presenting a check for $1000 to the Secretary of State's office by a certain date.

Democratic primary

Primary polling

Republican primary

The New Hampshire Republican primary is scheduled to be held on February 13, 2024.

General election

Polling
Joe Biden vs. Donald Trump

Joe Biden vs. Ron DeSantis

Joe Biden vs. Chris Sununu

Kamala Harris vs. Donald Trump

See also 
 United States presidential elections in New Hampshire
 2024 United States presidential election
 2024 Democratic Party presidential primaries
 2024 Republican Party presidential primaries
 2024 United States elections

Notes

Partisan clients

References 

New Hampshire
2024
Presidential